is Aiko Kayo's eighth single. It was released on July 27, 2005, by AVEX Records. The song was used as the AT-X Geki Natsu HAPPY! campaign image song. First pressings of the single included a picture label disc and poster.

Track listing
 Kanojo wa Gokigen Naname
 Sasurai no Tenshi
 Kanojo wa Gokigen Naname (Instrumental)
 Sasurai no Tenshi (Instrumental)

DVD track listing

 Kanojo wa Gokigen Naname PV
 Recording schedule

External links
 Kanojo wa Gokigen Naname at AVEX Records.

2005 singles
Aiko Kayō songs